Grasu may refer to:

 Grasu River, river in Romania
 Costel Grasu (born 1967), Romanian discus thrower 
 Hroniss Grasu (born 1991), American football player
 Nicoleta Grasu (born 1971), Romanian discus thrower
 Ștefan Grasu (born 2003), Romanian basketball player, son of Costel and Nicoleta

Disambiguation pages with surname-holder lists
Romanian-language surnames